The European Young Engineers (EYE)  is a European non-profit organisation, listed in the register of Engineering associations of the World Federation of Engineering Associations.

History 
Young members of the European engineers’ organisations created a pan-European platform and founded the European Young Engineers (EYE) in 1994. During the following years several engineering associations in Europe were invited to join.

EYE became an organisation consisting of more than 23 associations and representing approximately more than 250.000 young engineers in Europe. EYE started to offer its member organisations and their students and young engineers the access to a Europe-wide network by linking the engineering associations.

EYE offers a member-hosted conference. Between these events, the community stays in contact via their website.

In 2007 the European Young Engineers signed a Memorandum of Cooperation with FEANI.

List of member organisations

References 

Engineering societies
International scientific organizations based in Europe
Organisations based in Brussels
Organizations established in 1994
Youth science